Toluene diisocyanate (TDI) is an organic compound with the formula CH3C6H3(NCO)2. Two of the six possible isomers are commercially important: 2,4-TDI (CAS: 584-84-9) and 2,6-TDI (CAS: 91-08-7). 2,4-TDI is produced in the pure state, but TDI is often marketed as 80/20 and 65/35 mixtures of the 2,4 and 2,6 isomers respectively. It is produced on a large scale, accounting for 34.1% of the global isocyanate market in 2000, second only to MDI. Approximately 1.4 billion kilograms were produced in 2000.  All isomers of TDI are colorless, although commercial samples can appear yellow.

Synthesis
2,4-TDI is prepared in three steps from toluene via dinitrotoluene and 2,4-diaminotoluene (TDA).  Finally, the TDA is subjected to phosgenation, i.e., treatment with phosgene to form TDI. This final step produces HCl as a byproduct and is a major source of industrial hydrochloric acid.

Distillation of the raw TDI mixture produces an 80:20 mixture of 2,4-TDI and 2,6-TDI, known as TDI (80/20). Differentiation or separation of the TDI (80/20) can be used to produce pure 2,4-TDI and a 65:35 mixture of 2,4-TDI and 2,6-TDI, known as TDI (65/35).

Applications
The isocyanate functional groups in TDI react with hydroxyl groups to form carbamate (urethane) links.  The two isocyanate groups in TDI react at different rates: The 4-position is approximately four times more reactive than the 2-position. 2,6-TDI is a symmetrical molecule and thus has two isocyanate groups of similar reactivity, similar to the 2-position on 2,4-TDI. However, since both isocyanate groups are attached to the same aromatic ring, reaction of one isocyanate group will cause a change in the reactivity of the second isocyanate group. It is also sometimes used in rocket propellants.

It is used in the production of rigid polyurethane foams with a high temperature stability.

Hazards
The LD50 for TDI is 5800 mg/kg for oral contact and LC50 of 610 mg/m3 for the vapour.  Despite the indicated low toxicity, TDI is classified as “very toxic” by the European Community.

In the United States, the Occupational Safety and Health Administration has set a permissible exposure limit with a ceiling at 0.02 ppm (0.14 mg/m3), while the National Institute for Occupational Safety and Health has not established a recommended exposure limit, due to the classification of toluene diisocyanate as a possible occupational carcinogen.
This chemical was one of many that caused two massive explosions in a chemical warehouse stationed in Tianjin, China on August 13, 2015.

Information is available on handling, personal protective equipment, exposure monitoring, transport, storage, sampling and analysis of TDI, dealing with accidents, and health and environmental themes. All major producers of TDI are members of the International Isocyanate Institute, whose aim is the promotion of the safe handling of TDI in the workplace, community, and environment.

High-level exposure can result in reactive airways dysfunction syndrome.

See also
 Methylene diphenyl diisocyanate
 Hexamethylene diisocyanate
 Isophorone diisocyanate

References

External links
International Chemical Safety Card 0339
IARC Monograph: "Toluene Diisocyanates"
NIOSH Pocket Guide to Chemical Hazards
 NIOSH Safety and Health Topic: Isocyanates, from the website of the National Institute for Occupational Safety and Health (NIOSH)
 International Isocyanate Institute http://www.diisocyanates.org

Isocyanates
Monomers
IARC Group 2B carcinogens
Alkyl-substituted benzenes